João Paulo Fernando Marangon (born 17 March 1989) is a Brazilian retired footballer who primarily played right midfielder for Italian teams.

Career 
Marangon signed a contract with A.S. Roma after his 18th birthday, as his international transfer and contract period were no longer restricted by FIFA protection. In the 2008–09 season he briefly played in the Lega Pro Prima Divisione and Lega Pro Seconda Divisione. In February 2010, he was loaned to Igea Virtus.

He returned to his home country of Brazil in 2012 to play for Brasil de Farroupilha but shortly after moved to Gil Vicente FC. In 2013, he played for Esportivo Sulmona Calcio, and Miami United FC before returning to Italy to join Isernia in 2014. He retired in 2016 following his trade to Gallipoli Calcio and has worked as a scouting agent since. He is based in Rome but primarily scouts Brazilian players.

Personal life 
Marangon is the younger brother of former goalkeeper Doni (Doniéber Alexander Marangon).

On 20 May 2014 João Marangon was announced as a club executive for Miami Dade FC.

References

External links

Brazilian footballers
Brazilian expatriate footballers
Expatriate footballers in Italy
Expatriate footballers in Portugal
S.S. Virtus Lanciano 1924 players
A.S. Roma players
Gil Vicente F.C. players
Primeira Liga players
Association football midfielders
Footballers from São Paulo (state)
1989 births
Living people
Miami FC players
A.S.D. Gallipoli Football 1909 players
Isernia F.C. players
Pro Sulmona Calcio 1921 players
Clube Esportivo Bento Gonçalves players
Association football scouts